Verda may refer to:

People

Mononym
Saint Verda, 4th-century Persian martyr

Surname
Sandra Verda (1959-2014), Italian writer

Given name
Verda Erman (1944–2014), Turkish classical pianist
Verda Smith (1923–2000), American National Football League running back for the Los Angeles Rams
Verda Ün(1919–2011), Turkish female classical pianist
Verda Freeman Welcome (1907-1990), American teacher, civil rights leader, and Maryland state senator

Places
Puig de la Collada Verda, a mountain of Catalonia, Spain
Verda, Kentucky, a community in Harlan County, Kentucky, United States
Verda, Louisiana, a community in Grant Parish, Louisiana, United States